Stefanus Alliance International (SAI) is a Norwegian mission- and human rights organization, dedicated to defending freedom of belief and religion as expressed in Article 18 of the Universal Declaration of Human Rights. The organization is based in Oslo, Norway. Its motto, designated in 1996, is: "Together for the persecuted."

History

Stefanus Alliance International was established in 1967 by Monrad Norderval, Anutza Moise, Vemund Skard, Else-Marie Skard and Gulbrand Øverbye.  It was earlier known as the Mission Behind the Iron Curtain, or the Norwegian Mission to the East. The organization decided at its meeting of October 29, 2011 to change its name to Stefanus Alliance International as of January 1, 2012.

Activities

Stefanus Alliance International provides support, care, and practical help for churches and individuals who are persecuted or oppressed because of their religious beliefs. The organization also advocates on behalf of Christians and others who have had their religious rights violated. It commissioned a radio in 1968, published the newspaper Ropet fra Øst in 1971 (name changed to Magasinet Stefanus in 2012), and helped establish Forum 18 news service in 2003.

The NGO is a partner in the international Christian Solidarity Worldwide network since 2001.

Stefanus Alliance International awards the Stefanus Prize, a prestigious human rights prize to individuals who have made an outstanding contribution to the work for freedom of religion or belief as defined by the Article 18 of the Universal Declaration of Human Rights. Despite having historical roots as a Christian missions organization, Stefanus Alliance International in awarding the Stefanus Prize has recognized the efforts of individuals across different faiths.

Leadership 
On January 3, 2018, Stefanus Alliance International announced its search for a new secretary-general to replace Hilde Skaar Vollebæk. On April 3, 2018, Stefanus Alliance International publicized its decision to appoint Ed Brown as the new secretary-general as of August 1, 2018.

The organization is currently led by secretary-general Ed Brown. Former secretary generals include Lasse Trædal (1982-1989), John Victor Selle (1989-2002), Bjørn Wegge (2002-2013), Hans Aage Gravaas (2013-2017) and Hilde Skaar Vollebæk (2017-2018).

References

External links 
 Official Norwegian site

Religious organisations based in Norway
Human rights organisations based in Norway
Freedom of religion